Waldo Colburn (November 13, 1824 – September 26, 1885) was an American lawyer, jurist and politician from the Commonwealth of Massachusetts. Colburn was originally a member of the Whig party and after that party dissolved he became a Democrat. He was a descendant of Nathaniel Colburn, a selectman and signer of the Dedham Covenant.

Legal career
Colburn attended Harvard Law School from 1848 to 1849 studied law in the office of Ira Cleveland, and was admitted to the Massachusetts Bar on May 3, 1850.

Political career

In 1856 Colburn was elected to serve in the Massachusetts House of Representatives.  He was a member of the Dedham, Massachusetts Board of Selectmen, Board of Assessors and, Overseers of the Poor. In 1857 he was the Chairman of the Committee on Parishes, Religious Societies, Etc.  In 1858 he was the Chairman of the Committee on Railroads and Canals.  In 1870 he was elected to the Massachusetts Senate for the second Norfolk district. He was also a member of the building committee that erected Memorial Hall.

Judicial career
On May 27, 1875 Colburn was appointed as an associate justice of the Superior Court by Governor Gaston.

On November 19, 1882, Colburn was appointed by Governor Long as an associate justice of the Massachusetts Supreme Judicial Court.  Colburn served as an associate justice of the Court until his death.

See also
 1870 Massachusetts legislature

References

1824 births
1885 deaths
Phillips Academy alumni
Democratic Party Massachusetts state senators
Harvard Law School alumni
Democratic Party members of the Massachusetts House of Representatives
Justices of the Massachusetts Supreme Judicial Court
Lawyers from Dedham, Massachusetts
Dedham, Massachusetts selectmen
19th-century American politicians
19th-century American judges
19th-century American lawyers